Darren Arthur "Dizzy" Reed (born June 18, 1963) is an American musician and occasional actor. He is best known as the keyboardist for the hard rock band Guns N' Roses, with whom he has played, toured, and recorded since 1990.

Aside from lead singer Axl Rose, Reed is the longest-standing member of Guns N' Roses, and was the only member of the band to remain from their Use Your Illusion era until the 2016 return of guitarist Slash and bass guitarist Duff McKagan. 

In 2012, Reed was inducted into the Rock and Roll Hall of Fame as a member of Guns N' Roses, although he did not attend the ceremony. He was also a member of the Australian-American supergroup The Dead Daisies with his Guns N' Roses bandmate Richard Fortus, ex-Whitesnake member Marco Mendoza, ex-Mötley Crüe frontman John Corabi and session drummer Brian Tichy.

Early life
Reed was born as Darren Arthur Reed on June 18, 1963 in Hinsdale, Illinois, and was raised in Colorado. Reed was described as reclusive and introverted, however he has since denied this. His grandmother began teaching him to play the organ when he was a young child, and before he was out of elementary school, he formed small local bands.

Music career

As an adult, Reed pursued a music career in Los Angeles. He was a founding member of the club band The Wild in the late 1980s, with whom he spent five years.

Reed met the classic lineup of Guns N' Roses in 1985 while his band, The Wild, rehearsed in a neighboring studio. He kept in touch, and in 1990 was invited by friend Axl Rose to join their recording of the two Use Your Illusion albums and their subsequent tour.

Reed soon became an accepted member of the group and appeared on every album from Use Your Illusion I onward. As a member of Guns N' Roses, Reed has become well known for his keyboard, piano, and backing vocal work on such songs as "Estranged", "Live and Let Die", "November Rain", "Garden of Eden", "Civil War", "Yesterdays", and "Knockin' On Heaven's Door". In addition to playing keyboards or piano, Reed frequently provides backup on percussion and vocals during live Guns N' Roses performances of older songs, such as "Mr Brownstone", "Nightrain", "Welcome to the Jungle" and "Rocket Queen".

Reed continues to record and play live with the current Guns N' Roses line-up, and has now been a member of Guns N' Roses longer than any other member besides Axl Rose. Although Reed did not co-write any songs during the Illusion sessions, for Chinese Democracy he co-wrote "Chinese Democracy", "Catcher in the Rye", "Street of Dreams", "There Was a Time", "I.R.S", and "Oh My God". It has also been confirmed that the unfinished demo that did not make the cut on Chinese Democracy called "Silkworms" was written by Reed himself and the band's other keyboardist Chris Pitman. The song was re-worked and released as a single under the title "ABSUЯD" in 2021.

Work outside Guns N' Roses

Outside of Guns N' Roses, Reed played on albums for his former bandmates Slash, Duff McKagan, and Gilby Clarke. He also guested on former Guns N' Roses bassist Tommy Stinson's 2004 solo effort Village Gorilla Head. Reed is additionally a fan of Larry Norman, a pioneer of Christian music, and played on Norman's Copper Wires album. Most recently, he has composed music for the film scores The Still Life, released in 2006, and Celebrity Art Show (2008). His debut solo album will be released on February 16, 2018.

When he is not touring or recording with Guns N' Roses, Reed frequently tours with his hard rock cover band Hookers N' Blow, in which he plays keyboard and guitar and occasionally sings lead vocals. For his work with Hookers N' Blow, Reed was named Outstanding Keyboardist of the Year at the 2007 Rock City Awards ("Rockies"). Hookers N' Blow was also named Best Cover Band.

Reed has also dabbled in acting, appearing as 'Mumbles' in the 2005 film Charlie's Death Wish.

Reed was a member of The Dead Daisies alongside Guns N' Roses guitarist Richard Fortus, both left the band in 2015 to focus on Guns N' Roses.

Reed played keyboard on the 2019 album “You’re Welcome” by Cokie The Clown, a solo effort by NOFX frontman Fat Mike.

Personal life
Reed was married for 20 years to wife Lisa, an author, and special education teacher. They divorced in 2010. They have two daughters; Skye, born in 1992 and Shade born in 1996. He also has a daughter named Megan and one son (Justin Gunn-Reed born in 1988) from a previous relationship. In 2017, he also had a grandson, Riley, who is Morgan's son.

In 2005, Reed took the unusual step of seeking admission to a college fraternity well after the traditional age of inductees, and on January 22, 2006 was admitted to the Cornell University chapter of Zeta Psi.

Discography

Solo 
Albums

Other appearances

with Guns N' Roses 
Studio albums

Live albums

Compilation albums

Contributions

with Johnny Cash

with The Dead Daisies

Guest appearances

References

External links
 gunsnroses.com – Official Guns N' Roses website
 

1963 births
20th-century American musicians
21st-century American musicians
American heavy metal keyboardists
American rock keyboardists
American rock songwriters
Guns N' Roses members
Johnny Crash members
Living people
Musicians from Colorado
Musicians from Illinois
American rock pianists
American male pianists
Musicians from Los Angeles
People from Hinsdale, Illinois
Slash's Snakepit members
Songwriters from California
Songwriters from Colorado
Songwriters from Illinois
The Dead Daisies members
20th-century American pianists
21st-century American keyboardists
20th-century American keyboardists